Klára Cvrčková (born 25 July 2001) is a Czech footballer who plays as a striker for Sparta Prague.

She is a member of the Czech national team. She made her debut for the national team on 21 September 2021 in a match against Cyprus.

International goals

References

External links
 
 

2001 births
Living people
Czech women's footballers
Women's association football forwards
AC Sparta Praha (women) players
Footballers from Prague
Czech Republic women's international footballers
Czech Women's First League players